Yelabuga North is an airport in Russia located 5 km northeast of Yelabuga.  It is a minor airfield with utility tarmac and some hangars.  It appears to be an old airfield.

References
RussianAirFields.com

Airports built in the Soviet Union
Airports in Tatarstan